Minaret Nunatak is a minaret-like nunatak,  high, standing  west of Burkett Nunatak, in the Monument Nunataks of Antarctica, and  south of Mount VX-6. It was named by the Northern Party of the New Zealand Geological Survey Antarctic Expedition of 1962–63.

References

Nunataks of Victoria Land
Pennell Coast